The 2012–13 Nicholls State Colonels men's basketball team represented Nicholls State University during the 2012–13 NCAA Division I men's basketball season. The Colonels, led by ninth year head coach J. P. Piper, played their home games at Stopher Gym and were members of the Southland Conference. They finished the season 9–21, 8–10 in Southland play to finish in a tie for fifth place. They lost in the first round of the Southland tournament to McNeese State.

Roster

Schedule

|-
!colspan=9| Exhibition

|-
!colspan=9| Regular season

|-
!colspan=9| 2013 Southland Conference men's basketball tournament

References

Nicholls Colonels men's basketball seasons
Nicholls State
2012 in sports in Louisiana
2013 in sports in Louisiana